Przemysław is a Polish Slavic given name, meaning someone who is clever or ingenious. It is derived from another Polish name Przemysław, cognate to Czech Přemysl. Its diminutive forms include Przemek (the most popular one), Przemuś (hypocorism).

Its feminine form is Przemysława.

Name days 
Individuals named Przemysław may choose their name day from the following dates: April 13, September 4, October 10, or October 30.

People and characters with the name Przemysław 
 Przemysław Domański - a Polish ice skater
 Przemysław Frankowski - a Polish footballer
 Przemysław Karnowski (born 1993), Polish basketball player
 Przemysław Kaźmierczak - a Polish footballer
 Przemysław Matyjaszek - a Polish judoka
 Przemyslaw Prusinkiewicz - a Polish computer scientist 
 Przemysław Saleta - a Polish boxer
 Przemysław Skwirczyński - a Polish cinematographer
 Przemysław Słowikowski - a Polish sprinter
 Przemysław Tytoń - a Polish goalkeeper
 Przemysław Urbańczyk (born 1951), Polish archaeologist
 Przemysław Wacha - a Polish badminton player
 Przemysław Pawlicki - (born 1991), Polish Speedway Rider

See also 
 Polish name
 Slavic names
 Przemysl
Przemysław, Lubusz Voivodeship (west Poland)
Przemysław, Pomeranian Voivodeship (north Poland)
Przemysław, West Pomeranian Voivodeship (north-west Poland)

Polish masculine given names